Countess Magdalene of Waldeck-Wildungen (1558 – 9 September 1599), was a countess from the House of Waldeck and through marriage successively Countess of Hanau-Münzenberg and Countess of Nassau-Siegen.

Biography 
Magdalene was born in 1558 as the youngest daughter of Count Philip IV of Waldeck-Wildungen and his third wife Countess Jutta of Isenburg-Grenzau. The exact date and place of Magdalene’s birth are unknown.

Philip Louis succeeded his father in 1561 and was first under the regency of his uncle Count John VI ‘the Elder’ of Nassau-Siegen (Philip III of Hanau-Münzenberg and John VI ‘the Elder’ of Nassau-Siegen were both sons of Countess Juliane of Stolberg-Wernigerode). Politically, the marriage could represent a conscious withdrawal on her groom’s part from the politically dominant influence of his guardian, John VI ‘the Elder’ of Nassau-Siegen. Philip Louis died ‘Donnerstag nach Purificationis Mariæ, zwischen 4 und 5 Uhr Nachmittag durch eine Ohnmacht, welche ihre Gnaden ganz unversehentlich über Tisch und dem Spielen ankommen’ (‘Thursday after Purificationis Mariæ, between 4 and 5 o’clock in the afternoon by a fainting which His Grace completely unexpectedly suffered at the table and at the games’).

Magdalena remarried at Dillenburg Castle on 9 December 1581 to Count John VII ‘the Middle’ of Nassau-Siegen (7 June 1561 – Siegen Castle, 27 September 1623), the second son of Count John VI ‘the Elder’ of Nassau-Siegen and his first wife Landgravine Elisabeth of Leuchtenberg. Through his marriage to Magdalene, John ‘the Middle’ strengthened relations within the Wetterauer Grafenverein and thus contributed to the strengthening of the House of Nassau. John ‘the Middle’ was a cousin of Magdalena’s first husband. Magdalena’s great-grandmother Countess Joanne of Nassau-Siegen, was an older sister of Count John V of Nassau-Siegen, the great-grandfather of John ‘the Middle’. Magdalene’s great-great-grandmother Countess Jutta of Eppstein-Münzenberg was a granddaughter of Count Adolf I of Nassau-Siegen, the elder brother of Count Engelbert I of Nassau-Siegen, the grandfather of Count John V.

Magdalene died at Idstein Castle on 9 September 1599, where she stayed for the funeral of her nephew Count John Philip of Nassau-Idstein. Bernhard Textor wrote a Leichenpredigt for Magdalene which was published in Herborn in 1600.

John ‘the Middle’ remarried at Rotenburg Castle on 27 August 1603 to Duchess Margaret of Schleswig-Holstein-Sonderburg (Haus Sandberg am Alsensund near Sonderburg, 24 February 1583 – , Siegen, 10/20 April 1658), the youngest daughter of Duke John ‘the Younger’ of Schleswig-Holstein-Sonderburg and his first wife Duchess Elisabeth of Brunswick-Grubenhagen.

When his father died on 8 October 1606, John ‘the Middle’ succeeded his father together with his brothers William Louis, George, Ernest Casimir and John Louis. On 30 March 1607 the brothers divided their possessions. John acquired Siegen, Freudenberg, Netphen, Hilchenbach,  and the Haingericht.

There he had planned the construction of a dignified burial vault for the dynasty he founded. For this, there are remarkable notes in Latin, partly in elegiac couplets, for a projected memorial and burial place of the sovereign family, from the time around 1620, with the names of all 25 children from his two marriages, also with details of birth, marriage and death of his relatives. Since the project was not carried out, the burials of the members of the sovereign family between 1607 and 1658 took place in the inadequate burial vault under the choir of the mentioned parish church. At a time hitherto unknown, Magdalene was interred there with her husband John ‘the Middle’.

Issue

First marriage 
From the marriage of Magdalene with Philip Louis I of Hanau-Münzenberg, the following children were born:
 Count Philip Louis II (Hanau, 18 November 1576 – Hanau, 19 August 1612), succeeded his father as Count of Hanau-Münzenberg in 1580. Married in Dillenburg on 23 October/2 November 1596 to Countess Catherine Belgica of Nassau (Antwerp, 31 July 1578 – The Hague, 12/22 April 1648), daughter of Prince William I ‘the Silent’ of Orange and Duchess Charlotte of Bourbon-Montpensier.
 Juliane (13 October 1577 – 2 December 1577), buried in the choir of the St. Mary's Church in Hanau.
 William (26 August 1578 – 4 June 1579), also buried in the choir of St. Mary's Church in Hanau.
 Count Albrecht (12 November 1579 – Strasbourg, 19 December 1635), succeeded his father as Count of Hanau-Schwarzenfels in 1580. Married on 16 August 1604 to Countess Ehrengard of Isenburg-Birstein (1 October 1577 – Frankfurt, 21 September 1637).

Second marriage 
From the marriage of Magdalene with John VII ‘the Middle’ of Nassau-Siegen, the following children were born:
 John Ernest (Siegen Castle, 21 October 1582Jul. – Udine, 16/17 September 1617Jul.), was, among other things, a general in the Venetian army, involved in the Uskok War.
 Count John VIII ‘the Younger’ (Dillenburg Castle, 29 September 1583Jul. –  near Oudenaarde,– 27 July 1638), succeeded his father as Count of Nassau-Siegen in 1623. Married in Brussels on 13 August 1618 to Princess  (2 November 1594 – Brussels, 4 January 1663).
 Elisabeth (Dillenburg Castle, 8 November 1584 – , 26 July 1661), married in Wildungen in November 1604 to Count Christian of Waldeck-Wildungen (Eisenberg Castle, 24/25 December 1585 – , 31 December 1637).
 Adolf (Dillenburg Castle, 8 August 1586 – Xanten, 7 November 1608), was a captain in the Dutch States Army.
 Juliane (Dillenburg Castle, 3 September 1587 – Eschwege, 15 February 1643), married at Dillenburg Castle on 21 May 1603Jul. (Beilager) and in Kassel on 4 June 1603Jul. (Heimführung) to Landgrave Maurice of Hesse-Kassel (Kassel, 25 May 1572 – Eschwege, 15 March 1632).
 Anne Mary (Dillenburg Castle, 3 March 1589 – 22 February 1620), married in Dillenburg on 3 February 1611Jul. to Count  (ca. 1581 – 13 March 1653), Count of Falkenstein and Broich.
 John Albert (Dillenburg, 8 February 1590 – Dillenburg, 1590).
 Count William (Dillenburg, 13 August 1592 – Orsoy, 7/17 July 1642), was since 1624 count in a part of Nassau-Siegen and since 1633 field marshal of the Dutch States army. Married at Siegen Castle on 17 January 1619 to Countess Christiane of Erbach (5 juni 1596 – Culemborg, 6 juli 1646).
 Frederick Louis (2 February 1595 – Dillenburg, 22 April 1600Jul.).
 Magdalene (23 February 1596 – 6 December 1662), married:
 in August 1631 to Bernhard Moritz Freiherr von Oeynhausen-Velmede (1602 – Leipzig, 20 November 1632);
 on 25 August 1642  (20 March 1591 – Bremen, 5 May 1652).
 John Frederick (10 februari 1597 – 1597).

Known descendants
Magdalene has many known descendants. All reigning European monarchs, with the exception of the Fürst of Liechtenstein, are descendants of her, and also the heads of the no longer reigning royal houses of Baden, Greece, Lippe, Prussia, Romania and Waldeck and Pyrmont. Other known descendants are:
 the Prussian Field Marshal Fürst Leopold I of Anhalt-Dessau (der Alte Dessauer), 
 the French Field Marshal Maurice of Saxony, 
 the Austrian chancellor Klemens von Metternich, 
 the Romanian writer Carmen Sylva, 
 the Norwegian explorer Fridtjof Nansen, 
 the German chancellor Max von Baden, and 
 the German fighter pilot from World War I Manfred von Richthofen (The Red Baron).

Ancestors

Literature 
 : Die Landesverfassung in dem Hanauischen, in the series Hanauer Geschichtsblätter, issue 34, Hanau, 1996, .
 : Philipp Ludwig I. von Hanau-Münzenberg (1553-1580). Bildungsgeschichte und Politik eines Reichsgrafen in der zweiten Hälfte des 16. Jahrhunderts, in: Hessisches Jahrbuch für Landesgeschichte, vol. 32, 1982, .
 : Der Wetterauer Grafenverein, in the series Veröffentlichungen der Historischen Kommission für Hessen, vol. 52, Marburg, 1989, .
 : Genealogie des Hanauer Grafenhauses, in: Festschrift des Hanauer Geschichtsvereins zu seiner fünfzigjährigen Jubelfeier am 27. August 1894, Hanau, 1894.
 : Grundlage der Waldeckischen Landes- und Regentengeschichte, Arolsen, 1853.
 : Hanau Stadt und Land, 3rd ed., Hanau, 1919, reprinted 1978.

Notes

References

Sources 
 
 
 
  (1911). "Johan VII". In:  en  (redactie), Nieuw Nederlandsch Biografisch Woordenboek (in Dutch). Vol. Eerste deel. Leiden: A.W. Sijthoff. p. 1221.
  (1911). "Johan (Johann), de Jongere, graaf van Nassau-Siegen". In:  en  (redactie), Nieuw Nederlandsch Biografisch Woordenboek (in Dutch). Vol. Eerste deel. Leiden: A.W. Sijthoff. p. 1221–1222.
 
 
 
 
 
 
 
 
 
  (1999). "Genealogische tabellen". In:  e.a. (red.), Johan Wolfert van Brederode 1599-1655. Een Hollands edelman tussen Nassau en Oranje (in Dutch). Vianen: Historische Vereniging Het Land van Brederode/Zutphen: Uitgeversmaatschappij Walburg Pers. p. 133–135. .
 
 
 
 
 
 
 
 ;  (1999). "Johan Wolfert van Brederode 1599–1655 – ʻIn Opbloey neergetoghenʼ". In:  e.a. (red.), Johan Wolfert van Brederode 1599–1655. Een Hollands edelman tussen Nassau en Oranje (in Dutch). Vianen: Historische Vereniging Het Land van Brederode/Zutphen: Uitgeversmaatschappij Walburg Pers. p. 9–46. .
 
 
 
 
  (1994). "Die nassauischen Begräbnisstätten in der ev. Stadtkirche zu Dillenburg". In:  (Hg.), 650 Jahre Stadt Dillenburg. Ein Text- und Bildband zum Stadtrechtsjubiläum der Oranierstadt (in German). Dillenburg: Verlag E. Weidenbach GmbH + Co. KG. p. 119–125.
  (2004). "Die Fürstengruft zu Siegen und die darin von 1669 bis 1781 erfolgten Beisetzungen". In:  u.a. (Redaktion), Siegener Beiträge. Jahrbuch für regionale Geschichte (in German). Vol. 9. Siegen: Geschichtswerkstatt Siegen – Arbeitskreis für Regionalgeschichte e.V. p. 183–202.
 
 
  (1994). "Beisetzungen in den 15 Grabstellen der Dillenburger Nassauergruft". In:  (Hg.), 650 Jahre Stadt Dillenburg. Ein Text- und Bildband zum Stadtrechtsjubiläum der Oranierstadt (in German). Dillenburg: Verlag E. Weidenbach GmbH + Co. KG. p. 115–118.
  (1937). "Brederode, Joan Wolfert van". In:  en  (redactie), Nieuw Nederlandsch Biografisch Woordenboek (in Dutch). Vol. Tiende deel. Leiden: A.W. Sijthoff. p. 125–126.
 
  (1882). Het vorstenhuis Oranje-Nassau. Van de vroegste tijden tot heden (in Dutch). Leiden: A.W. Sijthoff/Utrecht: J.L. Beijers.

External links 
 Hanau. In: An Online Gotha, by Paul Theroff.
 Hanau-Münzenberg, Magdalena Gräfin von (in German). In: Landesgeschichtliches Informationssystem Hessen (LAGIS) (in German).
 Nassau. In: Medieval Lands. A prosopography of medieval European noble and royal families, compiled by Charles Cawley.
 Nassau Part 5. In: An Online Gotha, by Paul Theroff.
 Waldeck. In: An Online Gotha, by Paul Theroff.

Waldeck-Wildungen, Magdalene
Waldeck-Wildungen, Magdalene
House of Waldeck
Countesses of Hanau-Münzenberg
∞
Countesses of Nassau
∞
Waldeck-Wildungen, Magdalene
Waldeck-Wildungen, Magdalene